Mauro Ferrari (born 7 July 1959 in Padova, Italy) is a multi-disciplinary scientist, an academic educator, a university and hospital executive, and inventor, an international civil servant, an entrepreneur, a musician, a writer, and an amateur long-distance runner. He currently serves as Affiliate Professor of Pharmaceutics at the University of Washington, a position he has held since 2019. he is President and CEO of BrYet US, Inc Ferrari is credited as the originator of multiple advances in medical technology, including the first nanofluidic systems (1992), microchip-cell hybrid therapeutic implants (1995), silicon-based therapeutic microparticles (1998), nanostructured surfaces for proteomics and peptidomics (2005), multi-stage vectors for systemic therapy (2008), the formulation of transport oncophysics (2011), and injectable nanoparticle generators (2016) for the therapy of lung and liver metastases of mammary carcinomas. He is a pioneer in nanomedicine.

Early life and education
Ferrari spent his early years in Udine, where he attended the Liceo Classico J. Stellini, and Florence, before attending the University of Padova and earning his Laurea in Mathematics in 1985. He moved to Berkeley, California where he earned his master's and a doctorate in mechanical engineering from the University of California Berkeley.

Career

Professor of Engineering 
Ferrari became a tenured associate professor at Berkeley in the Department of Civil Engineering and of materials Science and Mineral Engineering. Upon recruitment to the Ohio State University, he served as the Edgar Hendrickson Professor of Biomedical Engineering, Professor of Internal Medicine, Mechanical Engineering and Materials Science. He was also the Associate Vice President, Health Sciences Technology and Commercialization, Associate Director of the Dorothy M. Davis Heart and Lung Research Institute and Director of the Biomedical Engineering Center. He studied medicine at The Ohio State University concurrently with his faculty appointment from 2002 to 2004. Throughout his academic career, Ferrari has supervised trainees and students who have gone on to senior faculty and leadership positions at premier universities like Oxford, Massachusetts Institute of Technology (MIT), University of California Berkeley, University of California San Francisco, Duke University, University of Washington, Brown University, EPFL Lausanne, and The Ohio State University.

Cancer researcher and hospital executive 
After his time at The Ohio State University, Ferrari moved to the University of Texas in Houston, serving both at the MD Anderson Cancer Center, and Health Science Center. There, he was the founding chairman of the department of nanomedicine and biomedical engineering, which was the first department of nanomedicine in any medical school in the world. In 2010 he accepted the position of president and CEO of the Houston Methodist Research Institute in Houston, TX. In 2014 he was also appointed to the rank of Executive Vice President of the Methodist Hospital, a position he retained until his retirement in 2019. Ferrari was also appointed as Chief Commercialization Officer of Houston Methodist in 2018. While at Houston Methodist he served as Professor and Associate Dean at Weill Cornell medical College, which is an academic partner of Houston Methodist Hospital.

Honors, decorations, awards and distinctions 
For his work as a scientist, Ferrari has received numerous recognitions. He is a member of The National Academy of Inventors, a foreign member of the National Academy of Sciences of Italy “Detta Dei Quaranta”, a corresponding member of the Pontifical Academy for Life, and a foreign member of the Academy of Arts and Sciences (SASA) of Serbia. He is a Fellow of the American Institute for Medical and Biological Engineering, the American Society of Mechanical Engineers, and the American Association for the Advancement of Science.

He was the recipient of the 2011 Founders Award of the Controlled Release Society, the 2015 Aurel Stodola Medal in Mechanical Engineering of the ETH Zurich, Switzerland, Wallace H. Coulter Award for Biomedical Innovation and Entrepreneurship, the ETH Zürich Stodola Medal, the Blaise Pascal Medal in Biomedical Engineering from the European Academy of Sciences, and the Innovator Award from the Breast Cancer Research Program of the Department of Defense. He received the Robert Heinlein award for microgravity research, and his experiments have flown on the International Space Station. He holds honorary doctorates in electrical engineering and biotechnology from the University of Palermo and the University of Naples “Federico II,” respectively, and adjunct or visiting faculty positions at many prestigious academic institutions worldwide. He received an Honorary Degree in Letters by the University of St. Thomas in Houston TX. A volume of research works from different laboratories was published as a tribute to his contributions to science, in occasion of Ferrari’s 60th birthday.

National and International Civil Servant 
As a pioneer in nanomedicine, Ferrari served as a Special Expert on nanotechnology for the National Cancer Institute (2003-2005) where he was instrumental in establishing the Alliance for Nanotechnology in Cancer in 2004. This role at the National Cancer Institute was carried out concurrently with his faculty employment at The Ohio State University, by agreement of the two institutions. The accomplishments of the Alliance for Nanotechnology in Cancer include thousands of scientific papers, giving rise to the discovery and clinical translation of new therapeutic and diagnostic agents. There are currently at least 17 cancer nanodrugs approved for clinical use worldwide, and over 100 clinical trials.

In 2019, the European Commission appointed Ferrari as the next President of the European Research Council (ERC), succeeding Jean-Pierre Bourguignon; he was selected by a search committee chaired by Mario Monti and comprising Nobel laureate Jules hoffman, CERN director General Fabiola Giannotti, and prior President of the ERC.  He took the post on 1 January 2020. Ferrari resigned in 7 April 2020, citing his disappointment at the lack of coordinated EU action to address the COVID-19 pandemic and the inaction by the ERC against the pandemic. He expressed frustration over opposition by the ERC Scientific Council to his efforts to launch a scientific program to combat the virus.

Controversy 
Ferrari was not alone in his criticism of the EU response to COVID-19. Following his resignation, The ERC Scientific Council countered that calling for specific research was contrary to their mandate. According to Science Magazine, "ERC, set up to reward bottom-up basic research ideas, does not designate money for specific research areas....Other EU organ[ization]s can and do pay for research in particular fields, including COVID-19, but ERC is designed to protect science from politics. Ferrari writes that 'the expected burden of death, suffering, societal transformation, and economic devastation' of the pandemic justifies breaking this rule."

The ERC responded on 8 April 2020: "...we regret Professor Ferrari's statement, which at best is economical with the truth." The ERC stated that Ferrari's "resignation in fact followed a written unanimous vote of no confidence”, which had taken place on 27 March 2020, where "all 19 active members of the ERC’s Scientific Council individually and unanimously requested that Mauro Ferrari resign from his position as ERC’s President", due to poor conduct in office, exploiting the position to further his own projects, and for consistently failing to represent the interests of the ERC.

They cited "a complete lack of appreciation for the raison-d’être of the ERC", "a lack of engagement with the ERC", with Ferrari "failing to participate in many important meetings, spending extensive time in the USA and failing to defend the ERC’s programme and mission," making "several personal initiatives within the Commission" without consulting the ERC, and being "involved in multiple external enterprises, some academic and some commercial, which took a lot of his time and effort and appeared on several occasions to take precedence over his commitment to ERC."

Ferrari disputed the ERC claims of his failing to meet his obligations and their accusations of inappropriate outside involvements, on the grounds that his contractual appointment was at 80% time, and all of his outside activities had been pre-approved by the European Commission. No evidence of inappropriate outside involvement was ever presented, anywhere.  As for the “personal initiatives with the Commission”, his work contract was as an Advisor to the European Commission.

On 7 April 2020, Ferrari officially resigned, stating to the media that he was "extremely disappointed by the European response”.

Other activities

Corporate boards
Ferrari has been a member of the Board of Directors for Arrowhead Pharmaceuticals from 2010–present.

Academic and Non-profit boards
Ferrari is a member of the Scientific Advisory Board at AMBER and he is the President of the international board of governors of the Dead Sea research Institute. He is also a member of the Engineering Leadership Board for the Cullen College of Engineering at the University of Houston.

Sports 
Ferrari played basketball in his youth, and now races marathons and ultramarathons as an amateur. He completed the 100 km (62 miles) Passatore foot race in 2012.

Research interests
Ferrari's research uses nanotechnology, microtechnology, physical sciences, mathematics, biomechanics, and material sciences to develop new technologies for health care applications like drug delivery and cancer therapeutics. He leads two Physical Sciences in Oncology centers, within the network of research centers sponsored by the National Cancer Institute of the National Institutes of Health. The research of these centers focused on understanding the physical and biomechanical biological barriers that reduce the efficacy of cancer therapeutics and immunotherapy. He developed a new drug called iNPG-pDox, composed of silicon nanoparticles loaded with polymeric doxorubicin, that had better results at lower doses in animal models compared to standard doxorubicin chemotherapy for metastatic breast cancer.

Published works
Ferrari has produced more than 500 publications, including seven books and 41 issued patents in the US and Europe. In June 2020, Ferrari and collaborators had a publication retracted from Science Advances Journal due to various image duplications suggesting possible scientific misconduct. In this publication, Ferrari was a middle author. Not being a first, senior, or corresponding author, he had no oversight over the work contributed to the paper by others, including the duplicated images.

In The Arts 
Ferrari has published a book of memoirs and observations. He is frequently featured in public as a blues and jazz baritone saxophonist and singer. He has performed with Jacob Wendt, Milton Hopkins, Texas Johnny Boy, Barbara Errico, Mauro Constantini, Piero Sidoti. He has also recorded and released an album with LA Rhythm and Blues Band, where he is featured at lead vocalist and alto saxophone soloist.

Books 
 Ferrari M, Granik VT, Imam A, Nadeau J, editors. Advances in Doublet Mechanics. Lecture Notes in Physics, New Series M: Monographs, vol. m 45. Berlin, Heidelberg, New York: Springer Verlag; 1997. 
 Ferrari M. Micro- and Nanofabricated Electro-Optical Mechanical Systems for Biomedical and Environmental Applications. SPIE, The International Society for Optical Engineering; January 1999 
 Lee A, Lee J, Ferrari M, editors. BioMEMS and Biomedical Nanotechnology. Vol I: Biological and Biomedical Nanotechnology. Springer. 2006. 
 Ozkan M, Heller M, Ferrari M, editors. BioMEMS and Biomedical Nanotechnology. Vol II: Micro/Nanotechnologies for Genomics and Proteomics. Springer. 2006. 
 Desai T, Bhatia SN, Ferrari M, editors. BioMEMS and Biomedical Nanotechnology. Vol III: Therapeutic Micro/Nanotechnologies. Springer. 2006. 
 Bashir R, Werely S, Ferrari M, editors. BioMEMS and Biomedical Nanotechnology. Vol IV: Biomolecular Sensing, Processing, and Analysis. Springer. 2006. 
 Cristini V, Ferrari M, Decuzzi P, editors. Nanoparticulate Delivery to Cancerous Lesions: Advances in Mathematical Modeling. Ferrari M, series editor. Fundamental Biomedical Technologies. Vol. 2. Springer. April 2010.

Selection of Journal articles

Patents

Personal life 
Ferrari met and married his first wife Marialuisa while they were both students at the University of Padova, and they moved to Berkeley, California. While he was faculty at the University of California Berkeley, Marialuisa died from cancer.
Ferrari married Paola Del Zotto from Udine, Italy in 1995. He has five children, including two sets of twins. His first three children were born of Marialuisa. He credits the untimely death of Marialuisa as the turning point of his career, from mathematics applied to engineering problems, to the search of innovative therapeutics for cancer.

References

1959 births
Living people
Scientists from Padua
Cornell University faculty
University of California, Berkeley alumni
COVID-19 pandemic in Italy